Gabriel Said Reynolds is an American academic and historian of religion, who serves as Jerome J. Crowley and Rosaleen G. Crowley Professor of Theology and Assistant Professor of Islamic Studies and Theology at the University of Notre Dame. His scholarship focuses on World Religions and World Church, History of Christianity, Qur'anic Studies, Origins of Islam, and Muslim-Christian relations.

Biography
Gabriel Said Reynolds obtained his Ph.D. in Islamic Studies at Yale University. In 2012-2013 he directed “The Qurʾān Seminar” alongside Mehdi Azaiez, a year-long collaborative project dedicated to encouraging dialogue among scholars of the Quran, the acts of which appeared as The Qurʾān Seminar Commentary. In 2016-2017 he directed the research project Un Dieu de vengeance et de miséricorde: Sur la théologie coranique en relation avec les traditions juive et chrétienne at the Fondation Institut d'Études Avancées de Nantes in France. Reynolds currently serves as CEO of the International Qur’anic Studies Association (IQSA), and is also a regular contributor to Notre Dame's World Religions and World Church podcast: Minding Scripture.

In 2008 he was the editor for The Qur'an in its Historical Context; essays included his own introduction, "Qur'anic Studies and its Controversies". In August 2015 the Times Literary Supplement published Variant Readings: The Birmingham Qur'an in The Context of Debate on Islamic Origins, a scholarly commentary of Reynolds about the discovery and analysis of the Birmingham Quran and its relations with other ancient Quranic manuscripts. In 2018 he has overseen commentaries on such aspects of Islam as the Nephilim in The Qurʾān and the Bible: Text and Commentary. In 2020 he wrote Allah: God in the Qurʾān, a scholarly treatise on the conception of God in Islam and its distinguishing features in Islamic theology, with a comparison between the portrayals of the Abrahamic god in the Bible and the Quran, respectively.

Publications

References

External links
 https://theology.nd.edu/people/gabriel-reynolds/
 https://www.academia.edu/25775465

20th-century American theologians
21st-century American theologians
American emigrants to France
American historians of religion
American Islamic studies scholars
Christian and Islamic interfaith dialogue
Historians of Christianity
History of Quran scholars
Living people
American scholars of Islam
People in interfaith dialogue
University of Notre Dame faculty
World Christianity scholars
Yale Divinity School alumni
Year of birth missing (living people)